KOI-5 is a triple star system composed of three stars: KOI-5 A, KOI-5 B and KOI-5 C, orbiting 1,870 light-years away. 

The two dim stellar companions to KOI-5A were discovered in 2016. KOI-5 A and B orbit each other every 29 years, and KOI-5 C orbits stars A and B every 400 years.  KOI-5C is physically associated with the core stellar pair with probability 99.98%.

Planetary system
Two planets orbiting one of KOI-5's stars were suspected since 2009 based on Kepler data, but KOI-5Ab was confirmed only in January 2021 after TESS determined the planet is orbiting KOI-5A. The exoplanet has caused interest in the scientific community because its orbital plane is misaligned with the closer star, suggesting it gave KOI-5Ab a gravitational kick during its development, resulting in the misalignment and inward migration to the current orbit. However, the confirmation of this planet has yet to be published in any peer-reviewed journal.

A second candidate planet was initially suspected, but was later found to be a false positive.

References 

Cygnus (constellation)
G-type main-sequence stars
0005
Planetary systems with one confirmed planet
J19185753+4438507
Triple star systems
Planetary transit variables